Shiny Days may refer to:

 Shiny Days (game), a 2012 remake of the erotic visual novel Summer Days
 "Shiny Days" (single), of 2018 by Asaka
 "Shiny Days!", a 2008 song by Stephanie on the album Stephanie

See also
 Shining Days (disambiguation)